Bharat Immunologicals and Biologicals Corporation Limited (BIBCOL) is a Public Sector Undertaking (PSU) of the Government of India. Established in 1989 in Bulandshahar, Uttar Pradesh, BIBCOL manufactures oral polio vaccines (OPVs) and other immunisers.

BIBCOL is under the administrative control of the Department of Biotechnology, Ministry of Science and Technology.

Products

Diarrhea Management Kit—Diarrhea Management Kit (Zinc Tablet + oral rehydration salts (ORS)) for management of diarrhea among young children.
Oral Polio Vaccine—The live oral polio vaccine (OPV) is a trivalent vaccine containing suspensions of type 1, 2 and 3 attenuated poliomyelitis viruses (Sabin strains) prepared in primary by monkey kidney cell culture.
Zinc Dispersible Tablet—The dispersible zinc tablet, BIBZinC-20 mg contains 20 mg of elemental zinc as active ingredient and contains sweetener and taste masker (Vanilla flavor) and is scored tablet. The product is in line with the recommendations of the WHO. The product is produced with technology transfer from Nutriset through the Department of Biotechnology, Ministry of Science and Technology, Government of India. The Nutriset product has been tested in Indian fields and clinical trials have evaluated the efficacy of zinc supplementation and safety.
IFA Tablets—Iron-deficiency anemia (IDA) is most ignored in developing countries and is the major cause of anemia. The Iron Folic Tablets (IFA Tablets) are a crucial component for treatment of iron deficiency and IDA.

See also 
 U. C. Chaturvedi

References

External links 
 http://www.bibcol.com/ (Official Website)

Government-owned companies of India
Companies based in Uttar Pradesh
Health care companies of India
Science and technology in Uttar Pradesh
Indian companies established in 1999
1999 establishments in Uttar Pradesh
Bulandshahr
Pharmaceutical companies established in 2009
Companies listed on the Bombay Stock Exchange
Biotechnology companies established in 2009